Agonimia flabelliformis is a species of corticolous (bark-dwelling) lichen in the family Verrucariaceae. Found in Europe, it was scientifically described as new to science in 2011 by Josef Halda, Paweł Czarnota, and Beata Guzow-Krzemińska. The thallus of the lichen consists of finger-like (dactyliform) to coral-like (coralloid) aggregations of goniocys]s (clumps of photobiont cells surrounded by fungal hyphae)
that form a roundish structure. The species epithet flabelliformis refers to the fan-shaped (flabellate) form of the thallus branches. In addition to Europe, the lichen has also been recorded in eastern North America and the Russian Far East.

References

Verrucariales
Lichen species
Lichens described in 2011
Lichens of Europe
Lichens of North America
Lichens of the Russian Far East